Shi Rui, courtesy name also Shi Rui, was a Chinese landscape and building painter in the early Ming Dynasty. His birth and death years are unknown. He was a native of Qiantang (錢塘, modern day Hangzhou in Zhejiang Province) and was active during the Xuande era (1426–1435) up to the Jingtai era (1449–1457). He served as an official at the Hall of Benevolence and Wisdom (仁智殿)

Notes

References
 Barnhart, R. M. et al. (1997). Three thousand years of Chinese painting. New Haven, Yale University Press. 
 Zhongguo gu dai shu hua jian ding zu (中国古代书画鑑定组). 2000. Zhongguo hui hua quan ji (中国绘画全集). Zhongguo mei shu fen lei quan ji. Beijing: Wen wu chu ban she. Volume 10.

Ming dynasty painters
Artists from Hangzhou
Painters from Zhejiang